The 1940–41 Michigan Wolverines men's basketball team represented the University of Michigan in intercollegiate basketball during the 1940–41 season.  The team finished the season in 7th place in the Big Ten Conference with an overall record of 9–10 and 5–7 against conference opponents.

Bennie Oosterbaan was in his third year as the team's head coach.  Michael Sofiak was the team's leading scorer with 192 points in 19 games for an average of 10.1 points per game.  Herbert Brogan was the team captain.

Statistical leaders

References

Michigan Wolverines men's basketball seasons
Michigan
Michigan Wolverines basketball
Michigan Wolverines basketball